The 2020–21 UEFA Women's Champions League knockout phase began on 9 December 2020 with the round of 32 and ended with the final on 16 May 2021 at the Gamla Ullevi in Gothenburg, Sweden, to decide the champions of the 2020–21 UEFA Women's Champions League. A total of 32 teams competed in the knockout phase.

Qualified teams
The knockout phase involved 32 teams: 22 teams which received a bye, and the ten winners of the second qualifying round.

Below are the 32 teams that participated in the knockout phase (with their 2020 UEFA women's club coefficients, which took into account their performance in European competitions from 2015–16 to 2019–20 plus 33% of their association coefficient from the same time span).

Format
Each tie in the knockout phase, apart from the final, was played over two legs, with each team playing one leg at home. The team that scored more goals on aggregate over the two legs advanced to the next round. If the aggregate score was level, the away goals rule was applied, i.e. the team that scored more goals away from home over the two legs advanced. If away goals wre also equal, then extra time was played. The away goals rule was again applied after extra time, i.e. if there were goals scored during extra time and the aggregate score was still level, the visiting team advanced by virtue of more away goals scored. If no goals were scored during extra time, the tie was decided by a penalty shoot-out. In the final, which was played as a single match, if the score was level at the end of normal time, extra time would be played, followed by a penalty shoot-out if the score remained tied.

The mechanism of the draws for each round was as follows:
In the draw for the round of 32, the sixteen teams with the highest UEFA women's club coefficients were seeded (with the title holders being the automatic top seed), and the other sixteen teams were unseeded. The seeded teams were drawn against the unseeded teams, with the seeded teams hosting the second leg. Teams from the same association could not be drawn against each other.
In the draw for the round of 16, the eight teams with the highest UEFA women's club coefficients were seeded (with the title holders being the automatic top seed should they qualify), and the other eight teams were unseeded. The seeded teams were drawn against the unseeded teams, with the order of legs decided by draw. Teams from the same association could not be drawn against each other.
In the draws for the quarter-finals and semi-finals, there were no seedings, and teams from the same association could be drawn against each other. As the draws for the quarter-finals and semi-finals were held together before the quarter-finals were played, the identity of the teams in the semi-finals were not known at the time of the draw. A draw was also held to determine the "home" team for the final (for administrative purposes as it was played at a neutral venue).

Schedule
The schedule of the competition was as follows (all draws were held at the UEFA headquarters in Nyon, Switzerland).

Bracket

Round of 32

The draw for the round of 32 was held on 24 November 2020, 12:00 CET.

Seeding
The 32 teams, including the 22 teams which received a bye and the ten winners of the second qualifying round, were seeded based on their UEFA women's club coefficients (the title holders were automatically seeded first). Prior to the draw, they were divided into four groups of eight teams, each containing four seeded teams and four unseeded teams, based on the restriction that teams from the same association could not be drawn against each other, and COVID-19 travel restrictions. The teams in each group were assigned a number, with seeded teams randomly assigned 1 to 4, and unseeded teams randomly assigned 5 to 8. Eight numbered balls were drawn, with the results applied to all Groups 1–4, such that a seeded team numbered 1 to 4 would play an unseeded team numbered 5 to 8 in each tie, with the unseeded team to be the home team of the first leg.

Notes

Summary

The first legs were played on 9 and 10 December, and the second legs on 15, 16 and 17 December 2020. The tie between Vålerenga and Brøndby was played as a single-leg match in Brøndby on 11 February 2021 due to the quarantine restrictions imposed by the relevant Norwegian authorities in response to the COVID-19 pandemic in Norway.

|}

Matches

St. Pölten won 3–0 on aggregate.

Lyon won 6–2 on aggregate.

Fortuna Hjørring won 6–2 on aggregate.

Barcelona won 8–2 on aggregate.

Rosengård won 17–0 on aggregate.

VfL Wolfsburg won 7–0 on aggregate.

Tied 2–2 on aggregate. BIIK Kazygurt won on away goals. 

LSK Kvinner won 2–1 on aggregate.

Manchester City won 5–1 on aggregate.

Fiorentina won 3–2 on aggregate.

Paris Saint-Germain won 8–1 on aggregate.

Sparta Prague won 3–1 on aggregate.

Chelsea won 8–0 on aggregate.

Bayern Munich won 6–1 on aggregate.

Atlético Madrid won 9–2 on aggregate.

Round of 16

The draw for the round of 16 was held on 16 February 2021, 12:00 CET.

Seeding
The sixteen winners of the round of 32 were seeded based on their UEFA women's club coefficients (the title holders, should they qualify, were automatically seeded first). Prior to the draw, they were divided into two groups of eight teams, each containing four seeded teams and four unseeded teams, based on the restriction that teams from the same association could not be drawn against each other, and COVID-19 travel restrictions. A seeded team was drawn against an unseeded team, with the first team drawn of the two to be the home team of the first leg.

Summary

The first legs were played on 3, 4 and 9 March, and the second legs on 10, 11 and 17 March 2021.

|}
Notes

Matches

VfL Wolfsburg won 4–0 on aggregate.

Barcelona won 9–0 on aggregate.

Rosengård won 4–2 on aggregate.

Bayern Munich won 9–1 on aggregate.

Manchester City won 8–0 on aggregate.

Paris Saint-Germain won 5–3 on aggregate.

Lyon won 5–1 on aggregate.

Chelsea won 3–1 on aggregate.

Quarter-finals

The draw for the quarter-finals was held on 12 March 2021, 12:00 CET.

The eight winners of the round of 16, including the winner of the tie between Paris Saint-Germain and Sparta Prague whose identity was not known at the time of the draw, were drawn without any seeding or restrictions, with the first team drawn in each tie to be the home team of the first leg.

Summary

The first legs were played on 24 March, and the second legs on 31 March, 1 and 18 April 2021.

|}

Matches

Bayern Munich won 4–0 on aggregate.

2–2 on aggregate. Paris Saint-Germain won on away goals.

Barcelona won 4–2 on aggregate.

Chelsea won 5–1 on aggregate.

Semi-finals

The draw for the semi-finals was held on 12 March 2021, 12:00 CET (after the quarter-final draw).

The four quarter-final winners, whose identity was not known at the time of the draw, were drawn without any seeding or restrictions, with the first team drawn in each tie to be the home team of the first leg.

Summary

The first legs were played on 25 April and the second legs on 2 May 2021.

|}

Matches

Barcelona won 3–2 on aggregate.

Chelsea won 5–3 on aggregate.

Final

The final was played on 16 May 2021 at Gamla Ullevi, Gothenburg. A draw was held on 12 March 2021, 12:00 CET (after the quarter-final and semi-final draws), to determine which semi-final winner would be designated as the "home" team for administrative purposes.

Notes

References

External links

UEFA Women's Champions League Matches: 2020–21, UEFA.com

2
December 2020 sports events in Europe
February 2021 sports events in Europe
March 2021 sports events in Europe
April 2021 sports events in Europe
May 2021 sports events in Europe